Eisenschmid is a German surname. Notable people with the surname include:

 Markus Eisenschmid (born 1995), German ice hockey player
 Nicola Eisenschmid (born 1996), German ice hockey player
 Tanja Eisenschmid (born 1993), German ice hockey player

German-language surnames